St.Mary's English School is an English medium high school in brahmavar, udupi, Karnataka. Established in 1984 it is recognised by the government of Karnataka.

Administration 
The Correspondent is Rev. Father Valerian Mendonca . The school celebrated its Silver Jubilee in 2009.

School building project 
For its 25th year, the school announced a new school building. Students moved from the old building besides the Mother of Sorrows Church, Udupi, to the newer building in 2010.

External links 
 Official website of the School

Schools in Udupi district
Educational institutions established in 1984
1984 establishments in Karnataka
Udupi
High schools and secondary schools in Karnataka